

31001–31100 

|-id=012
| 31012 Jiangshiyang ||  || Jiang Shiyang (born 1936) has made significant contributions to studies of pulsating variable stars and developments of astronomical instruments in China. He shared two National Science and Technology Progress Awards of China for participating in building the Xinglong telescopes, coude and radial velocity spectrometers. || 
|-id=015
| 31015 Boccardi ||  || Giovanni Boccardi, director of the Turin Observatory from 1900 until 1923 || 
|-id=020
| 31020 Skarupa ||  || Valerie Skarupa, American AMOS program manager || 
|-id=028
| 31028 Cerulli ||  || Vincenzo Cerulli, Italian astronomer || 
|-id=031
| 31031 Altiplano ||  || The Altiplano in the central Andes lies mostly within Bolivia and Peru, and hosts the cities of Puno, Potosi, Cuzco and La Paz. || 
|-id=032
| 31032 Scheidemann ||  || Heinrich Scheidemann (c. 1595–1663), a composer || 
|-id=037
| 31037 Mydon ||  || Mydon, a Paeonian charioteer fighting for the Trojans, was killed by Achilles near the Skamander river. || 
|-id=043
| 31043 Sturm || 1996 LT || Charles-François Sturm, 19th-century Swiss-French mathematician || 
|-id=061
| 31061 Tamao ||  || Tamao Nakamura, Japanese actress || 
|-id=065
| 31065 Beishizhang ||  || Shi-Zhang Bei, Chinese biophysicist, member of the Chinese Academy of Sciences, on the occasion of his 100th birthday || 
|-id=086
| 31086 Gehringer ||  || Tom Gehringer, American teacher † || 
|-id=087
| 31087 Oirase ||  || Oirase, the name of a gorge which runs through Towada, a city in Aomori Prefecture. || 
|-id=092
| 31092 Carolowilhelmina ||  || Carolowilhelmina is named in honor of the Dukes Karl and Wilhelm of Braunschweig. In 1745 they founded the alma mater of Carl-Friedrich Gauss, the Collegium Carolinum, nowadays known as the Technische Universität Braunschweig. || 
|-id=095
| 31095 Buneiou || 1997 DH || King Muryeong, known in Japanese as Buneiou, (462–523) was the 25th king of Baekje, an ancient kingdom located in the southwest of the Korean peninsula. || 
|-id=097
| 31097 Nucciomula ||  || Alfonso Mula (born 1956), Italian art critic, poet and writer, founder of the Empedocles International Academy of Culture and Philosophical Investigation, recipient of the 1994 Premio Telemone for literature || 
|-id=098
| 31098 Frankhill ||  || Frank Hill, American astronomer and heliosismologist || 
|}

31101–31200 

|-id=104
| 31104 Annanetrebko ||  || Anna Netrebko (born 1971) is an Austrian soprano of Russian origin. She has an ample and powerful voice, allowing her to play a broad repertoire going from the Italian operas, to Mozart to the Wagnerian operas. || 
|-id=105
| 31105 Oguniyamagata ||  || Oguni, town which is situated in the southwestern part of Yamagata prefecture Japan || 
|-id=109
| 31109 Janpalouš ||  || Jan Palouš, Czech astronomer at the Astronomický Ústav (Astronomical Institute) of the Akademie věd České republiky (Czech Academy of Sciences), instrumental in negotiating the entry of the Czech Republic into the European Southern Observatory || 
|-id=110
| 31110 Clapas ||  || Clapàs, an occitan word meaning « pile of rock debris », now the nickname of the Montpellier area of France || 
|-id=113
| 31113 Stull || 1997 QC || John Stull, American telescope maker, builder of the observatory at Alfred University || 
|-id=122
| 31122 Brooktaylor || 1997 SD || Brook Taylor, 17th–18th-century British mathematician. || 
|-id=124
| 31124 Slavíček ||  || Karel Slavícek, Jesuit missionary and scientist was the first Czech sinologist. || 
|-id=129
| 31129 Langyatai ||  || Langyatai, a three-story platform with a perimeter of several kilometers, was built along the Langya Mountain and beside the Yellow Sea with rammed earth more than 2,200 years ago. || 
|-id=134
| 31134 Zurria ||  || Giuseppe Zurria, professor of mathematics at the University of Catania || 
|-id=139
| 31139 Garnavich ||  || Peter M. Garnavich, American observational astrophysicist and associate professor at the University of Notre Dame, Indiana || 
|-id=147
| 31147 Miriquidi ||  || A synonym for the Erzgebirge, a 10th-century Old Saxon word meaning "an impenetrable great dark forest" || 
|-id=151
| 31151 Sajichugaku ||  || Saji chugaku is a junior high school in Saji with an astronomical observatory. || 
|-id=152
| 31152 Daishinsai ||  || The Great East Japan earthquake (Higashi nihon daishinsai; Tōhoku earthquake and tsunami) caused widespread destruction in eastern Japan and killed about 20000 people in March 2011. || 
|-id=153
| 31153 Enricaparri ||  || Enrichetta Parri (born 1935) is a mathematician who graduated the University in Florence in 1965. She is the wife of the first discoverer. || 
|-id=174
| 31174 Rozelot ||  || Jean Pierre Rozelot (born 1942) is a solar astronomer who has worked at Pic du Midi Observatory and at CERGA, which he directed between 1982 and 1988. He has been active in the teaching of astronomy but also the popularization of astronomy through the support to various societies and astronomy clubs in the southeast of France. || 
|-id=175
| 31175 Erikafuchs ||  || Erika Fuchs (1906–2005), a translator of Disney stories || 
|-id=179
| 31179 Gongju ||  || Gongju, a city located in South Chungcheong province of Korea || 
|-id=189
| 31189 Tricomi ||  || Francesco Giacomo Tricomi, 20th-century Italian mathematician || 
|-id=190
| 31190 Toussaint ||  || Roberta Marie Toussaint, American experimental physicist || 
|-id=192
| 31192 Aigoual ||  || Mont Aigoual, highest (1567 m) mountain of the Cévennes of southern France || 
|-id=196
| 31196 Yulong ||  || Yulong (meaning jade dragon) is the only Naxi language autonomous county in China || 
|}

31201–31300 

|-
| 31201 Michellegrand ||  || Michel Legrand (1932–2019) was a prolific French musical composer, arranger, conductor and jazz pianist. He composed the music of many well-known movies such as The Umbrellas of Cherbourg and The Young Girls of Rochefort. He won three Oscars and many other awards worldwide. || 
|-id=203
| 31203 Hersman ||  || Chris Becker Hersman, American spacecraft systems engineer for the New Horizons Pluto Kuiper Belt mission || 
|-id=230
| 31230 Tuyouyou ||  || Tu Youyouŋ (born 1930), a Chinese pharmacologist and Nobel Laureate. || 
|-id=231
| 31231 Uthmann || 1998 CA || Barbara Uthmann, 16th-century German businesswoman, said to have introduced the art of lace-making in the Erzgebirge Mountains of Saxony || 
|-id=232
| 31232 Slavonice || 1998 CF || Slavonice, Czech Republic || 
|-id=234
| 31234 Bea ||  || Beata Tomsza (born 1971) is a Polish nurse, a medical rescuer, and also a teacher at medical schools in Sosnowiec and Tychy. Bea has been a pen pal of the first discoverer for years || 
|-id=238
| 31238 Kroměříž ||  || Kroměříž, Moravia, Czech Republic, whose gardens and castle are a UNESCO World Heritage Site † || 
|-id=239
| 31239 Michaeljames ||  || Michael James, American high-school teacher of English || 
|-id=240
| 31240 Katrianne ||  || Katrin Susanne Lehmann, German teacher of physics and astronomy, and wife of the discoverer || 
|-id=249
| 31249 Renéefleming ||  || Renée Fleming (born 1959) is a well-known American lyrical soprano who has marked the scene with her roles in classical operas by Richard Strauss, Mozart, Handel, Verdi and Dvorak, as well as more modern pieces, such as \"le temps l´horloge\" by Henri Dutilleux. Name suggested by Natalie Dessay. || 
|-id=266
| 31266 Tournefort ||  || Joseph Pitton de Tournefort (1656–1708), French botanist || 
|-id=267
| 31267 Kuldiga ||  || Kuldīga, Latvia || 
|-id=268
| 31268 Welty || 1998 FA || Sandra Welty, American high-school teacher of English || 
|-id=271
| 31271 Nallino ||  || Carlo Alfonso Nallino (1872–1938), Italian orientalist || 
|-id=272
| 31272 Makosinski ||  || Ann Stasia Makosinski (born 1997) was awarded second place in the 2014 Intel International Science and Engineering Fair for her electrical and mechanical engineering project. || 
|-id=276
| 31276 Calvinrieder ||  || Calvin James Rieder (born 1997) was awarded second place in the 2014 Intel International Science and Engineering Fair for his environmental management project.  || 
|-id=281
| 31281 Stothers ||  || Duncan Bayard Stothers (born 1997) was awarded first place in the 2014 Intel International Science and Engineering Fair for his electrical and mechanical engineering project. || 
|-id=282
| 31282 Nicoleticea ||  || Nicole Sabina Ticea (born 1998) was awarded second place in the 2014 Intel International Science and Engineering Fair for her medicine and health sciences project. || 
|-id=283
| 31283 Wanruomeng ||  || Wan Ruomeng (born 1996) was awarded first place in the 2014 Intel International Science and Engineering Fair for her plant sciences project. || 
|-id=291
| 31291 Yaoyue ||  || Yao Yue (born 1997) was awarded best of category and first place in the 2014 Intel International Science and Engineering Fair for his computer science project, and also received the European Union Contest for Young Scientists Award. || 
|-id=298
| 31298 Chantaihei ||  || Chan Tai Hei (born 1996) was awarded best of category and first place in the 2014 Intel International Science and Engineering Fair for his chemistry team project, and also received the Philip V. Streich Memorial Award. || 
|}

31301–31400 

|-id=312
| 31312 Fangerhai ||  || Fang Er Hai (born 1996) was awarded best of category and first place in the 2014 Intel International Science and Engineering Fair for his chemistry team project, and also received the Philip V. Streich Memorial Award. || 
|-id=313
| 31313 Kanwingyi ||  || Kan Wing Yi (born 1998) was awarded second place in the 2014 Intel International Science and Engineering Fair for her environmental management project. || 
|-id=319
| 31319 Vespucci ||  || Amerigo Vespucci (1454–1512), an Italian explorer, navigator and cartographer. In 1507 the geographer Martin Waldseemüller published the first paper of the Mundus Novus associating the name America with Amerigo Vespucci || 
|-id=323
| 31323 Lysá hora ||  || Lysá hora, highest (1323 m) mountain of the Beskids (Beskydy) mountain range, the Czech Republic || 
|-id=324
| 31324 Jiřímrázek ||  || Jiří Mrázek, 20th-century Czech geophysicist, TV and radio popularizer of astronautics, astronomy, computer science and related subjects || 
|-id=336
| 31336 Chenyuhsin ||  || Chen Yu-Hsin (born 1996) was awarded best of category and first place in the 2014 Intel International Science and Engineering Fair for her earth science project, and also received the European Union Contest for Young Scientists Award. || 
|-id=338
| 31338 Lipperhey ||  || Hans Lipperhey (1570–1619), Dutch lensmaker, inventor of Dutch perspective glass, and first to design and seek a patent for a practical telescope || 
|-id=344
| 31344 Agathon ||  || Agathon, son of Priam and prince of Troy, is mentioned in Homer's Iliad as being one of the last surviving princes during the Trojan War. || 
|-id=349
| 31349 Uria-Monzon || 1998 SV || Béatrice Uria-Monzon (born 1963) is a French mezzo-soprano. She studied music and singing at the University of Bordeaux and at the lyric art school of the Paris opera. She has a broad repertoire but is noted for her many interpretations of the role of Carmen. || 
|-id=360
| 31360 Huangyihsuan ||  || Huang Yi-Hsuan (born 1996) was awarded best of category and first place in the 2014 Intel International Science and Engineering Fair for his plant sciences project, and also received the Dudley R. Herschbach SIYSS Award. || 
|-id=363
| 31363 Shulga ||  || Valery Mikhailovich Shulga, Ukrainian radio astronomer || 
|-id=374
| 31374 Hruskova ||  || Aranka Hruskova (born 1995) was awarded second place in the 2014 Intel International Science and Engineering Fair for her mathematical sciences project. || 
|-id=375
| 31375 Krystufek ||  || Robin Krystufek (born 1995) was awarded second place in the 2014 Intel International Science and Engineering Fair for his biochemistry project. || 
|-id=376
| 31376 Leobauersfeld ||  || Leonard Bauersfeld (born 1997) was awarded second place in the 2014 Intel International Science and Engineering Fair for his physics and astronomy team project. || 
|-id=377
| 31377 Kleinwort ||  || Lennart Julian Kleinwort (born 1998) was awarded best of category and first place in the 2014 Intel International Science and Engineering Fair for his mathematical sciences project, and also received the Intel Foundation Young Scientist Award. || 
|-id=378
| 31378 Neidinger ||  || Leonard Bauersfeld (born 1997) was awarded second place in the 2014 Intel International Science and Engineering Fair for his physics and astronomy team project. || 
|-id=380
| 31380 Hegyesi ||  || Hegyesi Donat Sandor (born 1995) was awarded second place in the 2014 Intel International Science and Engineering Fair for his electrical and mechanical engineering project. || 
|-id=387
| 31387 Lehoucq ||  || Roland Lehoucq (born 1965) is a French astrophysicist, working on cosmic topology. He is also very active in public outreach and is well known for his books on science fiction novels and movies such as Making Science with StarWars. Since 2012, he has been the president of the annual sci-fi convention "les Utopiales". || 
|-id=389
| 31389 Alexkaplan ||  || Alexandre Kaplan (1901–1973) was an electrical engineer, with a passion for astronautics and astronomy. A member of the groupe de Lorraine of the Societe Astronomique de France, he built an observatory for the use of astronomy clubs around the city of Nancy. || 
|-id=399
| 31399 Susorney ||  || Hannah Susorney (born 1991) is a former postdoctoral researcher at the University of British Columbia and a Marie Sklodowska-Curie Fellow at the University of Bristol. She studies topography of asteroids and the role of impact cratering on the surface evolution of planetary bodies. || 
|-id=400
| 31400 Dakshdua ||  || Daksh Dua (born 1997) was awarded best of category and first place in the 2014 Intel International Science and Engineering Fair for his animal sciences team project, and also received the Intel Foundation Cultural and Scientific Visit to China Award. || 
|}

31401–31500 

|-id=402
| 31402 Negishi || 1999 AR || Hiroyuki Negishi (born 1964), a Japanese amateur astronomer. || 
|-id=414
| 31414 Rotarysusa ||  || Rotary Club, Val Susa, Italy † || 
|-id=416
| 31416 Peteworden ||  || Pete Worden (born 1949), director of NASA's Ames Research Center. He was influential in many projects like the Clementine space mission, and indirectly in programs like ODAS, which allowed this asteroid to be discovered. An innovator and space enthusiast, he is a man of vision || 
|-id=418
| 31418 Sosaoyarzabal ||  || Andrea Sosa Oyarzabal (born 1968) is a professor of the Centro Universitario Regional del Este at the Universidad de la Republica de Uruguay. She specializes in the study of the dynamical and physical properties of the minor bodies of the Solar System. || 
|-id=426
| 31426 Davidlouapre ||  ||  (born 1978) is a French physicist whose thesis was on loop quantum gravity. Now working in industry, he is a very well-known French scientific YouTuber. || 
|-id=429
| 31429 Diegoazzaro ||  || Diego Azzaro (1925–2014) was an Italian amateur astronomer. A popularizer of astronomy, he was president of the association ASTRIS and Astronomical Observatory of Cervara di Roma. || 
|-id=431
| 31431 Cabibbo ||  || Nicola Cabibbo, Italian physicist || 
|-id=435
| 31435 Benhauck ||  || Ben Hauck (born 1978) has been an amateur astronomer for most of his life and is heavily involved in astronomy education and outreach. He is a passionate activist in the fight against climate change. || 
|-id=437
| 31437 Verma ||  || Abhishek Verma (born 1999) was awarded best of category and first place in the 2014 Intel International Science and Engineering Fair for his animal sciences team project. || 
|-id=438
| 31438 Yasuhitohayashi ||  || Yasuhito Hayashi (born 1996) was awarded second place in the 2014 Intel International Science and Engineering Fair for his animal sciences project. || 
|-id=439
| 31439 Mieyamanaka ||  || Mie Yamanaka (born 1996) was awarded second place in the 2014 Intel International Science and Engineering Fair for her energy and transportation project || 
|-id=442
| 31442 Stark ||  || Lawrence W. Stark, American professor emeritus of physiological optics and engineering || 
|-id=450
| 31450 Stevepreston ||  || US occultation observer and skilled mathematician, Steve Preston (born 1956), introduced asteroidal predictions of unprecedented accuracy in 2001, significantly increasing observation rates worldwide. He was elected president of the International Occultation Timing Association in 2014. || 
|-id=451
| 31451 Joenickell ||  || Joe Nickell, the senior research fellow of the Committee for Skeptical Inquiry || 
|-id=453
| 31453 Arnaudthiry ||  ||  (born 1988), a French photographer and science popularizer, mainly known for his YouTube channel "Astronogeek" (in French). His channel features videos debunking false science and UFO-related stories. || 
|-id=458
| 31458 Delrosso ||  || Renzo Del Rosso (born 1957), an Italian amateur astronomer, astrophotographer, lecturer and writer of astronomical software || 
|-id=460
| 31460 Jongsowfei ||  || Faye Jong-Sow Fei (born 1998) was awarded best of category and first place in the 2014 Intel International Science and Engineering Fair for her environmental management project, and also received the European Union Contest for Young Scientists Award. || 
|-id=461
| 31461 Shannonlee ||  || Shannon Xinjing Lee (born 1996) was awarded best of category and first place in the 2014 Intel International Science and Engineering Fair for her energy and transportation project. || 
|-id=462
| 31462 Brchnelova ||  || Michaela Brchnelova (born 1996) was awarded first place in the 2014 Intel International Science and Engineering Fair for her physics and astronomy project. || 
|-id=463
| 31463 Michalgeci ||  || Michal Geci (born 1995) was awarded second place in the 2014 Intel International Science and Engineering Fair for his physics and astronomy team project || 
|-id=464
| 31464 Liscinsky ||  || Martin Liscinsky (born 1995) was awarded second place in the 2014 Intel International Science and Engineering Fair for his physics and astronomy team project. || 
|-id=465
| 31465 Piyasiri ||  || Namal Udara Piyasiri (born 1996) was awarded second place in the 2014 Intel International Science and Engineering Fair for his electrical and mechanical engineering project. || 
|-id=466
| 31466 Abualhassan ||  || Hayat Abdulredha Abu Alhassan (born 1997) was awarded second place in the 2014 Intel International Science and Engineering Fair for her environmental sciences team project. || 
|-id=468
| 31468 Albastaki ||  || Hayat Abdulredha Abu Alhassan (born 1997) was awarded second place in the 2014 Intel International Science and Engineering Fair for her environmental sciences team project. || 
|-id=469
| 31469 Aizawa ||  || Ken Aizawa (born 1996) was awarded best of category and first place in the 2014 Intel International Science and Engineering Fair for his biochemistry project. || 
|-id=470
| 31470 Alagappan ||  || Perry Alagappan (born 1997) was awarded best of category and first place in the 2014 Intel International Science and Engineering Fair for his environmental sciences project. || 
|-id=471
| 31471 Sallyalbright ||  || Sally Albright (born 1999) was awarded first place in the 2014 Intel International Science and Engineering Fair for her environmental management team project. || 
|-id=473
| 31473 Guangning ||  || Guangning An (born 1996) was awarded second place in the 2014 Intel International Science and Engineering Fair for his biochemistry project. || 
|-id=474
| 31474 Advaithanand ||  || Advaith Anand (born 1997) was awarded second place in the 2014 Intel International Science and Engineering Fair for his materials and bioengineering project. || 
|-id=475
| 31475 Robbacchus ||  || Robert M. Bacchus (born 1996) was awarded second place in the 2014 Intel International Science and Engineering Fair for his medicine and health sciences project. || 
|-id=476
| 31476 Bocconcelli ||  || Carlo Bocconcelli (born 1996) was awarded second place in the 2014 Intel International Science and Engineering Fair for his cellular and molecular biology project. || 
|-id=477
| 31477 Meenakshi ||  || Meenakshi Bose (born 1997) was awarded second place in the 2014 Intel International Science and Engineering Fair for her medicine and health sciences project. || 
|-id=479
| 31479 Botello ||  || Christopher Rafael Botello (born 1998) was awarded second place in the 2014 Intel International Science and Engineering Fair for his energy and transportation project. || 
|-id=480
| 31480 Jonahbutler ||  || Jonah Zachariah Butler (born 1997) was awarded second place in the 2014 Intel International Science and Engineering Fair for his energy and transportation project. || 
|-id=482
| 31482 Caddell ||  || John Chapman Alexander Caddell (born 1998) was awarded best of category and first place in the 2014 Intel International Science and Engineering Fair for his physics and astronomy project. || 
|-id=483
| 31483 Caulfield ||  || Sarayu Caulfield (born 1997) was awarded second place in the 2014 Intel International Science and Engineering Fair for her behavioral and social sciences team project. || 
|-id=487
| 31487 Parthchopra ||  || Parth Chopra (born 1996) was awarded second place in the 2014 Intel International Science and Engineering Fair for his computer science project. || 
|-id=489
| 31489 Matthewchun ||  || Matthew Leong Chun (born 1996) was awarded second place in the 2014 Intel International Science and Engineering Fair for his chemistry project || 
|-id=490
| 31490 Swapnavdeka ||  || Swapnav Deka (born 1997) was awarded second place in the 2014 Intel International Science and Engineering Fair for his microbiology project. || 
|-id=491
| 31491 Demessie ||  || Bluye DeMessie (born 1997) was awarded second place in the 2014 Intel International Science and Engineering Fair for his environmental management project. || 
|-id=492
| 31492 Jennarose ||  || Jenna Rose DiRito (born 1996) was awarded second place in the 2014 Intel International Science and Engineering Fair for her medicine and health sciences team project. || 
|-id=493
| 31493 Fernando-Peiris ||  || Achal James Fernando-Peiris (born 1997) was awarded first place in the 2014 Intel International Science and Engineering Fair for his physics and astronomy project. He also received the Innovation Exploration Award. || 
|-id=494
| 31494 Emmafreedman ||  || Emma R. Freedman (born 1999) was awarded second place in the 2014 Intel International Science and Engineering Fair for her environmental management project. || 
|-id=495
| 31495 Sarahgalvin ||  || Sarah Nicole Galvin (born 1996) was awarded best of category and first place in the 2014 Intel International Science and Engineering Fair for her electrical and mechanical engineering project. || 
|-id=496
| 31496 Glowacz ||  || Julian Stefan Glowacz (born 1998) was awarded second place in the 2014 Intel International Science and Engineering Fair for his plant sciences team project. || 
|-id=500
| 31500 Grutzik ||  || Petra Luna Grutzik (born 1996) was awarded second place in the 2014 Intel International Science and Engineering Fair for her behavioral and social sciences project. || 
|}

31501–31600 

|-
| 31501 Williamhang ||  || William C. Hang (born 1997) was awarded second place in the 2014 Intel International Science and Engineering Fair for his computer science project. || 
|-id=502
| 31502 Hellerstein ||  || Joshua Kopel Hellerstein (born 1996) was awarded first place in the 2014 Intel International Science and Engineering Fair for his electrical and mechanical engineering project. || 
|-id=503
| 31503 Jessicahong ||  || Jessica Hong (born 1997) was awarded second place in the 2014 Intel International Science and Engineering Fair for her chemistry team project. || 
|-id=504
| 31504 Jaisonjain ||  || Jaison Jain (born 1998) was awarded second place in the 2014 Intel International Science and Engineering Fair for his plant sciences team project. || 
|-id=507
| 31507 Williamjin ||  || William Huang Jin (born 1995) was awarded second place in the 2014 Intel International Science and Engineering Fair for his microbiology project. || 
|-id=508
| 31508 Kanevsky ||  || Ariel Benjamin Kanevsky (born 1997) was awarded first place in the 2014 Intel International Science and Engineering Fair for his computer science project. || 
|-id=510
| 31510 Saumya ||  || Ariel Benjamin Kanevsky (born 1997) was awarded first place in the 2014 Intel International Science and Engineering Fair for his computer science project. || 
|-id=511
| 31511 Jessicakim ||  || Jessica Kim (born 1997) was awarded first place in the 2014 Intel International Science and Engineering Fair for her energy and transportation team project. || 
|-id=512
| 31512 Koyyalagunta ||  || Divya Koyyalagunta (born 1995) was awarded first place in the 2014 Intel International Science and Engineering Fair for her behavioral and social sciences project. || 
|-id=513
| 31513 Lafazan ||  || Justin Chase Lafazan (born 1996) was awarded second place in the 2014 Intel International Science and Engineering Fair for his behavioral and social sciences project. || 
|-id=516
| 31516 Leibowitz ||  || Michal Leibowitz (born 1996) was awarded second place in the 2014 Intel International Science and Engineering Fair for her environmental management team project. || 
|-id=517
| 31517 Mahoui ||  || Iman Mahoui (born 1998) was awarded second place in the 2014 Intel International Science and Engineering Fair for her cellular and molecular biology project. || 
|-id=519
| 31519 Mimamarquez ||  || Michelle Marie Marquez (born 1999) was awarded best of category and first place in the 2014 Intel International Science and Engineering Fair for her behavioral and social sciences project. || 
|-id=522
| 31522 McCutchen ||  || Jonathan James McCutchen (born 1999) was awarded first place in the 2014 Intel International Science and Engineering Fair for his environmental sciences project. || 
|-id=523
| 31523 Jessemichel ||  || Jesse Martin Michel (born 1997) was awarded second place in the 2014 Intel International Science and Engineering Fair for his mathematical sciences project. || 
|-id=525
| 31525 Nickmiller ||  || Nicholas Paul Miller (born 1996) was awarded second place in the 2014 Intel International Science and Engineering Fair for his microbiology project. || 
|-id=531
| 31531 ARRL ||  || American Radio Relay League, the largest membership organization of radio amateurs in the United States || 
|-id=555
| 31555 Wheeler ||  || John Archibald Wheeler, American theoretical physicist || 
|-id=556
| 31556 Shatner ||  || William Shatner (born 1931), a Canadian actor. || 
|-id=557
| 31557 Holleybakich ||  || Holley Bakich (born 1969) is an artist who has created graphics for astronomy books, websites, and magazine articles. She also pencils, inks, and colors the popular web comic Outer Space Pals. She has earned degrees in Fine Art and Interior Design and incorporates astronomical subjects in her work whenever possible. || 
|-id=559
| 31559 Alonmillet ||  || Alon Millet (born 1998) was awarded second place in the 2014 Intel International Science and Engineering Fair for his plant sciences project. || 
|-id=569
| 31569 Adriansonka ||  || Adrian Sonka (born 1977) is a Romanian astronomer at the Astronomical Institute (Bucharest) whose research contributions include astrometry and photometry of near-Earth objects, with dedication toward communicating astronomy to the public in Romania. || 
|-id=573
| 31573 Mohanty ||  || Ahneesh Jayant Mohanty (born 1997) was awarded second place in the 2014 Intel International Science and Engineering Fair for his medicine and health sciences project. || 
|-id=574
| 31574 Moshova ||  || Andrew Moshova (born 1997) was awarded first place in the 2014 Intel International Science and Engineering Fair for his energy and transportation team project. || 
|-id=575
| 31575 Nikhilmurthy ||  || Nikhil Murthy (born 1999) was awarded second place in the 2014 Intel International Science and Engineering Fair for his chemistry project. || 
|-id=576
| 31576 Nandigala ||  || Vipul Nandigala (born 1997) was awarded second place in the 2014 Intel International Science and Engineering Fair for his physics and astronomy project. || 
|-id=580
| 31580 Bridgetoei ||  || Bridget Ann Oei (born 1995) was awarded second place in the 2014 Intel International Science and Engineering Fair for her environmental sciences project. || 
|-id=581
| 31581 Onnink ||  || Carly Onnink (born 1998) was awarded second place in the 2014 Intel International Science and Engineering Fair for her animal sciences team project. || 
|-id=582
| 31582 Miraeparker ||  || Mirae Leigh Parker (born 1995) was awarded second place in the 2014 Intel International Science and Engineering Fair for her electrical and mechanical engineering team project. || 
|-id=584
| 31584 Emaparker ||  || Ema Linnea Parker (born 1998) was awarded second place in the 2014 Intel International Science and Engineering Fair for her electrical and mechanical engineering team project. || 
|-id=588
| 31588 Harrypaul ||  || Harry Paul (born 1996) was awarded best of category and first place in the 2014 Intel International Science and Engineering Fair for his materials and bioengineering project. || 
|-id=592
| 31592 Jacobplaut ||  || Jacob Mitchell Plaut (born 1996) was awarded second place in the 2014 Intel International Science and Engineering Fair for his environmental management team project. || 
|-id=593
| 31593 Romapradhan ||  || Roma Vivek Pradhan (born 1996) was awarded second place in the 2014 Intel International Science and Engineering Fair for her computer science project. || 
|-id=594
| 31594 Drewprevost ||  || Drew Prevost (born 1998) was awarded second place in the 2014 Intel International Science and Engineering Fair for his electrical and mechanical engineering project. || 
|-id=595
| 31595 Noahpritt ||  || Noah Christian Pritt (born 1996) was awarded second place in the 2014 Intel International Science and Engineering Fair for his computer science project. || 
|-id=596
| 31596 Ragavender ||  || Ritesh Narayan Ragavender (born 1996) was awarded first place in the 2014 Intel International Science and Engineering Fair for his mathematical sciences project || 
|-id=597
| 31597 Allisonmarie ||  || Allison Marie Raines (born 1998) was awarded first place in the 2014 Intel International Science and Engineering Fair for her environmental management team project. || 
|-id=598
| 31598 Danielrudin ||  || Daniel Rudin (born 1996) was awarded second place in the 2014 Intel International Science and Engineering Fair for his environmental management team project. || 
|-id=599
| 31599 Chloesherry ||  || Chloe Sherry (born 1996) was awarded second place in the 2014 Intel International Science and Engineering Fair for her animal sciences project. || 
|-id=600
| 31600 Somasundaram ||  || Sriram Somasundaram (born 1997) was awarded second place in the 2014 Intel International Science and Engineering Fair for his biochemistry project. || 
|}

31601–31700 

|-id=605
| 31605 Braschi ||  || Nicoletta Braschi, Italian actress || 
|-id=617
| 31617 Meeraradha ||  || Meera Radha Srinivasan (born 1997) was awarded second place in the 2014 Intel International Science and Engineering Fair for her environmental sciences project. || 
|-id=618
| 31618 Tharakan ||  || Serena Margaret Tharakan (born 1996) was awarded second place in the 2014 Intel International Science and Engineering Fair for her medicine and health sciences team project. || 
|-id=619
| 31619 Jodietinker ||  || Jodie Leigh Tinker (born 1996) was awarded first place in the 2014 Intel International Science and Engineering Fair for her cellular and molecular biology project. || 
|-id=627
| 31627 Ulmera ||  || Alexandra Ulmer (born 1996) was awarded second place in the 2014 Intel International Science and Engineering Fair for her behavioral and social sciences team project. || 
|-id=628
| 31628 Vorperian ||  || Sevahn Kayaneh Vorperian (born 1996) was awarded second place in the 2014 Intel International Science and Engineering Fair for her biochemistry project. || 
|-id=630
| 31630 Jennywang ||  || Jenny Lynn Wang (born 1997) was awarded second place in the 2014 Intel International Science and Engineering Fair for her computer science project. || 
|-id=631
| 31631 Abbywilliams ||  || Abigail Anne Williams (born 1997) was awarded second place in the 2014 Intel International Science and Engineering Fair for her animal sciences team project. || 
|-id=632
| 31632 Stephaying ||  || Stephanie Ying (born 1996) was awarded second place in the 2014 Intel International Science and Engineering Fair for her microbiology project. || 
|-id=633
| 31633 Almonte ||  || Carolyn Marie Almonte (born 2003), a finalist in the 2015 Broadcom MASTERS, a math and science competition for middle school students, for her medicine and health sciences project. || 
|-id=635
| 31635 Anandarao ||  || Pranav Kumar Anandarao (born 2001), a finalist in the 2015 Broadcom MASTERS, a math and science competition for middle school students, for his energy project. || 
|-id=637
| 31637 Bhimaraju ||  || Manasa Hari Bhimaraju (born 2003), a finalist in the 2015 Broadcom MASTERS, a math and science competition for middle school students, for her electrical and mechanical engineering project. || 
|-id=639
| 31639 Bodoni ||  || Evelyn Ariana Bodoni (born 2002), a finalist in the 2015 Broadcom MASTERS, a math and science competition for middle school students, for her behavioral and social sciences project. || 
|-id=640
| 31640 Johncaven ||  || John Blake Caven (born 2003), a finalist in the 2015 Broadcom MASTERS, a math and science competition for middle school students, for his computer science and software engineering project. || 
|-id=641
| 31641 Cevasco ||  || Hannah Olivia Cevasco (born 2000), a finalist in the 2015 Broadcom MASTERS, a math and science competition for middle school students, for her medicine and health sciences project. || 
|-id=642
| 31642 Soyounchoi ||  || Soyoun Choi (born 1999), a finalist in the 2015 Broadcom MASTERS, a math and science competition for middle school students, for her behavioral and social sciences project. || 
|-id=643
| 31643 Natashachugh ||  || Natasha Chugh (born 2001), a finalist in the 2015 Broadcom MASTERS, a math and science competition for middle school students, for her electrical and mechanical engineering project. || 
|-id=648
| 31648 Pedrosada ||  || Pedro Antonio Valdes Sada (born 1973) is a professor of physics and mathematics at the Universidad de Monterrey (Mexico), whose research includes astrometry and photometry of asteroids as well as stellar occultations. || 
|-id=650
| 31650 Frýdek-Místek || 1999 HW || Frýdek-Místek, twin cities on the Silesia-Moravia border, Czech Republic, the discoverer's childhood home town || 
|-id=655
| 31655 Averyclowes ||  || Avery Parker Clowes (born 2002), a finalist in the 2015 Broadcom MASTERS, a math and science competition for middle school students, for his electrical and mechanical engineering project. || 
|-id=660
| 31660 Maximiliandu ||  || Maximilian Junqi Du (born 2002), a finalist in the 2015 Broadcom MASTERS, a math and science competition for middle school students, for his chemistry project. || 
|-id=661
| 31661 Eggebraaten ||  || Andrew John Eggebraaten (born 2001), a finalist in the 2015 Broadcom MASTERS, a math and science competition for middle school students, for his electrical and mechanical engineering project. || 
|-id=664
| 31664 Randiiwessen ||  || Randii Wessen, American program engineer at JPL || 
|-id=665
| 31665 Veblen ||  || Oswald Veblen, early 20th-century American mathematician || 
|-id=671
| 31671 Masatoshi ||  || Masatoshi Nakamura, Japanese actor and singer || 
|-id=677
| 31677 Audreyglende ||  || Audrey Glende (born 2003), a finalist in the 2015 Broadcom MASTERS, a math and science competition for middle school students, for her microbiology and biochemistry project. || 
|-id=679
| 31679 Glenngrimmett ||  || Glenn Manuel Grimmett (born 2001) is a finalist in the 2015 Broadcom MASTERS, a math and science competition for middle school students, for his animal science project. || 
|-id=680
| 31680 Josephuitt ||  || Joseph Arthur Huitt (born 2000), a finalist in the 2015 Broadcom MASTERS, a math and science competition for middle school students, for his animal science project. || 
|-id=682
| 31682 Kinsey ||  || Elizabeth Grace Kinsey (born 2001), a finalist in the 2015 Broadcom MASTERS, a math and science competition for middle school students, for her environmental and earth sciences project. || 
|-id=684
| 31684 Lindsay ||  || Mikayla Ann Lindsay (born 2002), a finalist in the 2015 Broadcom MASTERS, a math and science competition for middle school students, for her physics project. || 
|-id=688
| 31688 Bryantliu ||  || Bryant Michael Liu (born 2001), a finalist in the 2015 Broadcom MASTERS, a math and science competition for middle school students, for his plant science project || 
|-id=689
| 31689 Sebmellen ||  || Sebastian Lucas Mellen (born 2001), a finalist in the 2015 Broadcom MASTERS, a math and science competition for middle school students, for his computer science and software engineering project. || 
|-id=690
| 31690 Nayamenezes ||  || Naya Kiren Menezes (born 2001), a finalist in the 2015 Broadcom MASTERS, a math and science competition for middle school students, for her physics project. || 
|-id=696
| 31696 Rohitmital ||  || Rohit Rahul Mital (born 2002), a finalist in the 2015 Broadcom MASTERS, a math and science competition for middle school students, for his environmental and earth sciences project. || 
|-id=697
| 31697 Isaiahoneal ||  || Isaiah Logan O'Neal (born 2001),  a finalist in the 2015 Broadcom MASTERS, a math and science competition for middle school students, for his plant science project. || 
|-id=698
| 31698 Nikolaiortiz ||  || Nikolai Victorovitch Ortiz (born 2002) is a finalist in the 2015 Broadcom MASTERS, a math and science competition for middle school students, for his environmental and earth sciences project. He attends the Seashore Middle Academy, Corpus Christi, Texas || 
|-id=700
| 31700 Naperez ||  || Nicholas Antonio Perez (born 2001), a finalist in the 2015 Broadcom MASTERS, a math and science competition for middle school students, for his materials & bioengineering project. || 
|}

31701–31800 

|-
| 31701 Ragula ||  || Kanishka Ragula (born 2001), a finalist in the 2015 Broadcom MASTERS, a math and science competition for middle school students, for his energy project. || 
|-id=706
| 31706 Singhani ||  || Anish Singhani (born 2002), a finalist in the 2015 Broadcom MASTERS, a math and science competition for middle school students, for his electrical and mechanical engineering project. || 
|-id=711
| 31711 Suresh ||  || Sriyaa Suresh (born 2001), a finalist in the 2015 Broadcom MASTERS, a math and science competition for middle school students, for her animal science project. || 
|-id=716
| 31716 Matoonder ||  || Madison Alise Toonder (born 2001), a finalist in the 2015 Broadcom MASTERS, a math and science competition for middle school students, for her environmental and earth sciences project. || 
|-id=719
| 31719 Davidyue ||  || David Yue (born 2001), a finalist in the 2015 Broadcom MASTERS, a math and science competition for middle school students, for his computer science and software engineering project. || 
|-id=725
| 31725 Anushazaman ||  || Anusha Zaman (born 2001), a finalist in the 2015 Broadcom MASTERS, a math and science competition for middle school students, for her cellular/molecular biology and biochemistry project. || 
|-id=727
| 31727 Amandalewis ||  || Amanda Lewis, a mentor of a finalist in the 2015 Broadcom MASTERS, a math and science competition for middle school students. || 
|-id=728
| 31728 Rhondah ||  || Rhonda Hendrickson, a mentor of a finalist in the 2015 Broadcom MASTERS, a math and science competition for middle school students.  || 
|-id=729
| 31729 Scharmen ||  || Chris Scharmen, a mentor of a finalist in the 2015 Broadcom MASTERS, a math and science competition for middle school students. || 
|-id=731
| 31731 Johnwiley ||  || John Wiley, a mentor of a finalist in the 2015 Broadcom MASTERS, a math and science competition for middle school students. || 
|-id=737
| 31737 Carriecoombs ||  || Carrie Coombs, a mentor of a finalist in the 2015 Broadcom MASTERS, a math and science competition for middle school students. || 
|-id=744
| 31744 Shimshock ||  || Nicole Shimshock, a mentor of a finalist in the 2015 Broadcom MASTERS, a math and science competition for middle school students. || 
|-id=767
| 31767 Jennimartin ||  || Jennifer Martin, a mentor of a finalist in the 2015 Broadcom MASTERS, a math and science competition for middle school students. || 
|-id=770
| 31770 Melivanhouten ||  || Melissa Van Houten, a mentor of a finalist in the 2015 Broadcom MASTERS, a math and science competition for middle school students. || 
|-id=771
| 31771 Kirstenwright ||  || Kirsten Wright, a mentor of a finalist in the 2015 Broadcom MASTERS, a math and science competition for middle school students. || 
|-id=772
| 31772 Asztalos ||  || Melissa Asztalos, a mentor of a finalist in the 2015 Broadcom MASTERS, a math and science competition for middle school students. || 
|-id=774
| 31774 Debralas ||  || Amy Winegar, a mentor of a finalist in the 2015 Broadcom MASTERS, a math and science competition for middle school students. || 
|-id=777
| 31777 Amywinegar ||  || Amy Winegar, a mentor of a finalist in the 2015 Broadcom MASTERS, a math and science competition for middle school students. || 
|-id=778
| 31778 Richardschnur ||  || Richard Schnur, a mentor of a finalist in the 2015 Broadcom MASTERS, a math and science competition for middle school students. || 
|-id=787
| 31787 Darcylawson ||  || Darcy Lawson, a mentor of a finalist in the 2015 Broadcom MASTERS, a math and science competition for middle school students. || 
|}

31801–31900 

|-id=807
| 31807 Shaunalennon ||  || Shauna Lennon, a mentor of a finalist in the 2015 Broadcom MASTERS, a math and science competition for middle school students. || 
|-id=823
| 31823 Viète ||  || François Viète, 16th-century French lawyer and mathematician, inventor of the modern algebraic notation || 
|-id=824
| 31824 Elatus ||  || Elatus, mythological centaur, killed during a battle with Hercules by a poisoned arrow that passed through his arm and continued to wound Chiron in the knee || 
|-id=836
| 31836 Poshedly ||  || Kenneth T. Poshedly (born 1949) is the tireless publisher and editor-in-chief of the Journal of the Association of Lunar and Planetary Observers. In 2010 he won the Peggy Haas Service Award for his work with that organization. || 
|-id=838
| 31838 Angelarob ||  || Angela Robinson, a mentor of a finalist in the 2015 Broadcom MASTERS, a math and science competition for middle school students. || 
|-id=839
| 31839 Depinto ||  || Alyssa DePinto, a mentor of a finalist in the 2015 Broadcom MASTERS, a math and science competition for middle school students. || 
|-id=840
| 31840 Normnegus ||  || Norm Negus, a mentor of a finalist in the 2015 Broadcom MASTERS, a math and science competition for middle school students. || 
|-id=844
| 31844 Mattwill ||  || Matthew L. Will (born 1957) is an amateur astronomer and longtime secretary and treasurer of the Association of the Lunar and Planetary Observers. In 2003 he was presented with the Peggy Haas Service Award for his work with that organization. || 
|-id=846
| 31846 Elainegillum ||  || Elaine Gillum, a mentor of a finalist in the 2015 Broadcom MASTERS, a math and science competition for middle school students. || 
|-id=848
| 31848 Mikemattei ||  || Michael Mattei (born 1940) worked at Harvard College Observatory Agassiz Station as a young man moving to optics with various institutions and companies culminating in his work with M.I.T. Lincoln Labs working on projects from microscope optics to space telescopes. || 
|-id=853
| 31853 Rahulmital ||  || Rahul Mital, a mentor of a finalist in the 2015 Broadcom MASTERS, a math and science competition for middle school students. || 
|-id=854
| 31854 Darshanashah ||  || Darshana Shah, a mentor of a finalist in the 2015 Broadcom MASTERS, a math and science competition for middle school students. || 
|-id=858
| 31858 Raykanipe ||  || Raymond Kanipe, a mentor of a finalist in the 2015 Broadcom MASTERS, a math and science competition for middle school students. || 
|-id=859
| 31859 Zemaitis ||  || Valerie Zemaitis, a mentor of a finalist in the 2015 Broadcom MASTERS, a math and science competition for middle school students. || 
|-id=861
| 31861 Darleshimizu ||  || Darlene Shimizu, a mentor of a finalist in the 2015 Broadcom MASTERS, a math and science competition for middle school students. || 
|-id=862
| 31862 Garfinkle ||  || Robert A. Garfinkle (born 1947) is a Fellow of the Royal Astronomical Society and author of best-selling observational astronomy books and many articles. He is also the British Astronomical Association Lunar Section Historian and the Association of Lunar and Planetary Observers Book Review Editor. || 
|-id=863
| 31863 Hazelcoffman ||  || Hazel Coffman, a mentor of a finalist in the 2015 Broadcom MASTERS, a math and science competition for middle school students. || 
|-id=872
| 31872 Terkán ||  || Lajos Terkán, early 20th-century member of the staff of the Konkoly Obszervatórium (Konkoly Observatory), who proposed and initiated the photographic observation of comets and minor planets there || 
|-id=873
| 31873 Toliou ||  || Athanasia (Sissy) Toliou (born 1988) is a postdoctoral researcher at the Luleå University of Technology (Sweden) whose studies include the orbital dynamics of near-Earth objects and primordial asteroids and comets. || 
|-id=875
| 31875 Saksena ||  || Hitu Saksena, a mentor of a finalist in the 2015 Broadcom MASTERS, a math and science competition for middle school students. || 
|-id=876
| 31876 Jenkens ||  || Robert Jenkens (born 1962), Deputy Project Manager for the OSIRIS-REx Asteroid Sample Return Mission. || 
|-id=877
| 31877 Davideverett ||  || David Everett (born 1964), Project Systems Engineer for the OSIRIS-REx Asteroid Sample Return Mission. || 
|-id=883
| 31883 Susanstern ||  || Susan Stern, a mentor of a finalist in the 2015 Broadcom MASTERS, a math and science competition for middle school students. || 
|-id=885
| 31885 Greggweger ||  || Gregg Weger, a mentor of a finalist in the 2015 Broadcom MASTERS, a math and science competition for middle school students. || 
|-id=886
| 31886 Verlisak ||  || Verlisa Kennedy, a mentor of a finalist in the 2015 Broadcom MASTERS, a math and science competition for middle school students. || 
|-id=888
| 31888 Polizzi ||  || Cristian David Polizzi (born 1996) was awarded second place in the 2015 Intel International Science and Engineering Fair for his energy team project. || 
|-id=893
| 31893 Rodriguezalvarez ||  || Agustin Rodriguez Alvarez (born 1996) was awarded second place in the 2015 Intel International Science and Engineering Fair for his energy team project || 
|-id=896
| 31896 Gaydarov ||  || Petar Milkov Gaydarov (born 1996) was awarded second place in the 2015 Intel International Science and Engineering Fair for his math project. || 
|-id=897
| 31897 Brooksdasilva ||  || Candace Rose Brooks-Da Silva (born 1999) was awarded second place in the 2015 Intel International Science and Engineering Fair for her engineering mechanics project. || 
|-id=899
| 31899 Adityamohan ||  || Aditya Anand Mohan (born 1997) was awarded first place in the 2015 Intel International Science and Engineering Fair for his biomedical and health sciences project. || 
|}

31901–32000 

|-
| 31901 Amitscheer ||  || Amit Scheer (born 1998) was awarded second place in the 2015 Intel International Science and Engineering Fair for his biomedical and health sciences project. || 
|-id=902
| 31902 Raymondwang ||  || Raymond Wang (born 1998) was awarded best of category award and first place in the 2015 Intel ISEF for his engineering mechanics project. He also received the Gordon E. Moore Award and the Cultural and Scientific Visit to China Award. || 
|-id=903
| 31903 Euniceyou ||  || Eunice Linh You (born 1996) was awarded first place in the 2015 Intel International Science and Engineering Fair for her microbiology project. || 
|-id=904
| 31904 Haoruochen ||  || Hao Ruochen (born 1997) was awarded best of category award and first place in the 2015 Intel ISEF for his physics and astronomy project. He also received the London International Youth Science Forum, Philip V. Streich Memorial Award. || 
|-id=905
| 31905 Likinpong ||  || Li Kin Pong Michael (born 1997) was awarded second place in the 2015 Intel International Science and Engineering Fair for his materials science team project. || 
|-id=907
| 31907 Wongsumming ||  || Wong Sum Ming Simon (born 1997) was awarded second place in the 2015 Intel International Science and Engineering Fair for his materials science team project. || 
|-id=909
| 31909 Chenweitung ||  || Chen Wei-Tung (born 1998) was awarded first place in the 2015 Intel International Science and Engineering Fair for his embedded systems project. || 
|-id=910
| 31910 Moustafa ||  || Yasmine Yehya Moustafa (born 1998) was awarded first place in the 2015 Intel International Science and Engineering Fair for her earth and environmental sciences project. || 
|-id=911
| 31911 Luciafauth ||  || Lucia Fauth (b. 1997) was awarded best of category award and first place in the 2015 Intel ISEF for her embedded systems project. She also received the Intel Foundation Cultural and Scientific Visit to China Award. She attends the Friedrich-Schiller-Gymnasium, Marbach am Neckar, Germany. || 
|-id=912
| 31912 Lukasgrafner ||  || Lukas Grafner (born 1997) was awarded second place in the 2015 Intel International Science and Engineering Fair for his engineering mechanics team project. || 
|-id=916
| 31916 Arnehensel ||  || Arne Hensel (born 1996) was awarded best of category award and first place in the 2015 Intel ISEF for his chemistry project. He also received the Dudley R. Hershbach SIYSS Award. || 
|-id=917
| 31917 Lukashohne ||  || Lukas Hohne (born 1997) was awarded second place in the 2015 Intel International Science and Engineering Fair for his engineering mechanics team project. || 
|-id=918
| 31918 Onkargujral ||  || Onkar Singh Gujral (born 1996) was awarded second place in the 2015 Intel International Science and Engineering Fair for his systems software project. || 
|-id=919
| 31919 Carragher ||  || Christopher Carragher (born 1996) was awarded second place in the 2015 Intel International Science and Engineering Fair for his computational biology and bioinformatics project. || 
|-id=920
| 31920 Annamcevoy ||  || Anna Maria McEvoy (born 1996) was awarded second place in the 2015 Intel International Science and Engineering Fair for her plant sciences project. || 
|-id=922
| 31922 Alsharif ||  || Shaima Lutfi Al-Sharif (born 1999) was awarded second place in the 2015 Intel International Science and Engineering Fair for her behavioral and social sciences project. || 
|-id=925
| 31925 Krutovskiy ||  || Roman Krutovskiy (born 1998) was awarded second place in the 2015 Intel International Science and Engineering Fair for his math project. || 
|-id=926
| 31926 Alhamood ||  || Abdul Jabbar Abdulrazaq Alhamood (born 1996) was awarded best of category award and first place in the 2015 Intel ISEF for his plant sciences project. He also received the Dudley R. Hershbach SIYSS Award. || 
|-id=928
| 31928 Limzhengtheng ||  || Lim Zheng Theng (born 1998) was awarded second place in the 2015 Intel International Science and Engineering Fair for his environmental engineering team project. || 
|-id=931
| 31931 Sipiera ||  || Paul P. Sipiera, American planetary geologist and meteoricist || 
|-id=933
| 31933 Tanyizhao ||  || Tan Yi Zhao (born 1998) was awarded second place in the 2015 Intel International Science and Engineering Fair for his environmental engineering team project. || 
|-id=934
| 31934 Benjamintan ||  || Tan Kye Jyn Benjamin (born 1998) was awarded second place in the 2015 Intel International Science and Engineering Fair for his environmental engineering team project. || 
|-id=935
| 31935 Midgley ||  || Anna Illing Midgley (born 1999) was awarded second place in the 2015 Intel International Science and Engineering Fair for her plant sciences project. || 
|-id=936
| 31936 Bernardsmit ||  || Bernard Adriaan Smit (born 1997) was awarded second place in the 2015 Intel International Science and Engineering Fair for his microbiology project. || 
|-id=937
| 31937 Kangsunwoo ||  || Kang Sun Woo (born 1997) was awarded second place in the 2015 Intel International Science and Engineering Fair for her earth and environmental sciences project. || 
|-id=938
| 31938 Nattapong ||  || Nattapong Chueasiritaworn (born 2000) was awarded best of category award and first place in the 2015 Intel ISEF for his animal sciences team project. He also received the European Union Contest for Young Scientists Award. || 
|-id=939
| 31939 Thananon ||  || Thananon Hiranwanichchakorn (born 1998) was awarded best of category award and first place in the 2015 Intel ISEF for his animal sciences team project. He also received the European Union Contest for Young Scientists Award. || 
|-id=940
| 31940 Sutthiluk ||  || Sutthiluk Rakdee (born 1999) was awarded best of category award and first place in the 2015 Intel International Science and Engineering Fair for her animal sciences team project. || 
|-id=943
| 31943 Tahsinelmas ||  || Tahsin Elmas (born 1996) was awarded second place in the 2015 Intel International Science and Engineering Fair for his chemistry team project || 
|-id=944
| 31944 Seyitherdem ||  || Seyit Alp Herdem (born 1995) was awarded second place in the 2015 Intel International Science and Engineering Fair for his chemistry team project || 
|-id=946
| 31946 Sahilabbi ||  || Sahil Abbi (born 1999) was awarded second place in the 2015 Intel International Science and Engineering Fair for his systems software team project || 
|-id=951
| 31951 Alexisallen ||  || Alexis Sue Allen (born 1998) was awarded first place in the 2015 Intel International Science and Engineering Fair for her animal sciences project. || 
|-id=952
| 31952 Bialtdecelie ||  || Meghan Dong Duo Bialt-DeCelie (born 1997) was awarded second place in the 2015 Intel International Science and Engineering Fair for her plant sciences team project. || 
|-id=953
| 31953 Bontha ||  || Naveena Bontha (born 1999) was awarded second place in the 2015 Intel International Science and Engineering Fair for her engineering mechanics project || 
|-id=954
| 31954 Georgiebotev ||  || Georgie Botev (born 1998) was awarded second place in the 2015 Intel International Science and Engineering Fair for his embedded systems project || 
|-id=956
| 31956 Wald ||  || Abraham Wald, 20th-century American statistician || 
|-id=957
| 31957 Braunstein ||  || Simone Braunstein (born 1997) was awarded second place in the 2015 Intel International Science and Engineering Fair for her robotics and intelligent machines project. || 
|-id=959
| 31959 Keianacave ||  || Keiana Ashli Cavé (born 1998) was awarded second place in the 2015 Intel International Science and Engineering Fair for her earth and environmental sciences project. || 
|-id=969
| 31969 Yihuachen ||  || Yi Hua Chen (born 1998) was awarded second place in the 2015 Intel International Science and Engineering Fair for her cellular and molecular biology project. || 
|-id=971
| 31971 Beatricechoi ||  || Seung Hye (Beatrice) Choi (born 1998) was awarded second place in the 2015 Intel International Science and Engineering Fair for her chemistry project. || 
|-id=972
| 31972 Carlycrump ||  || Carly Elizabeth Crump (born 1996) was awarded best of category award and first place in the 2015 Intel ISEF for her microbiology project. She also received the Dudley R. Hershbach SIYSS Award. || 
|-id=973
| 31973 Ashwindatta ||  || Ashwin Nivas Datta (born 1998) was awarded first place in the 2015 Intel International Science and Engineering Fair for his engineering mechanics project. || 
|-id=975
| 31975 Johndean ||  || John L. Dean (born 1997) was awarded second place in the 2015 Intel International Science and Engineering Fair for his physics and astronomy project. || 
|-id=976
| 31976 Niyatidesai ||  || Niyati Ketan Desai (born 1997) was awarded second place in the 2015 Intel International Science and Engineering Fair for her physics and astronomy project. || 
|-id=977
| 31977 Devalapurkar ||  || Sanath Kumar Devalapurkar (born 2000) was awarded best of category award and first place in the 2015 Intel ISEF for his math project. He also received the European Union Contest for Young Scientists Award. || 
|-id=978
| 31978 Jeremyphilip ||  || Jeremy Philip D´Silva (born 1999) was awarded second place in the 2015 Intel International Science and Engineering Fair for his biomedical and health sciences project. || 
|-id=980
| 31980 Axelfeldmann ||  || Axel Stephan Feldmann (born 1997) was awarded second place in the 2015 Intel International Science and Engineering Fair for his computational biology and bioinformatics project. || 
|-id=982
| 31982 Johnwallis ||  || John Wallis, 17th-century British mathematician, inventor of the symbol ∞ for infinity || 
|-id=984
| 31984 Unger ||  || Adam Unger (born 1919), a basket maker by profession, was heavily involved in the construction of the Starkenburg Observatory. || 
|-id=985
| 31985 Andrewryan ||  || Andrew J. Ryan (born 1988) is a postdoctoral research associate at University of Arizona and works on the OSIRIS-Rex mission to asteroid (101955) Bennu. He is an expert in the thermal conductivity of planetary materials. || 
|-id=988
| 31988 Jasonfiacco ||  || Jason Christopher Fiacco (born 1998) was awarded second place in the 2015 Intel International Science and Engineering Fair for his biochemistry team project. || 
|-id=991
| 31991 Royghosh ||  || Roy Ghosh (born 2000) was awarded second place in the 2015 Intel International Science and Engineering Fair for his biomedical and health sciences project.  || 
|-id=996
| 31996 Goecknerwald ||  || Claire Goeckner-Wald (born 1996) was awarded second place in the 2015 Intel International Science and Engineering Fair for her physics and astronomy team project. || 
|}

References 

031001-032000